Spiroxasone is a synthetic, steroidal antimineralocorticoid of the spirolactone group which was developed as a diuretic and antihypertensive agent but was never marketed. It was synthesized and assayed in 1963. The drug is 7α-acetylthiospirolactone with the ketone group removed from the C17α spirolactone ring. Similarly to other spirolactones like spironolactone, spiroxasone also possesses antiandrogen activity.

References

Abandoned drugs
Acetate esters
Antimineralocorticoids
Pregnanes
Spiro compounds
Spirolactones
Steroidal antiandrogens
Thioesters